The Harpactirinae (commonly called baboon spiders) are a subfamily of tarantulas which are native to the continent of Africa.  Like many Old World tarantulas, they have a relatively strong venom, and can inflict a painful bite.

Description

Harpactirinae are ground-dwelling spiders which build silk-lined burrows, often under debris such as stones, using their fangs and chelicerae for digging.  Habitats include savanna woodlands, grasslands, and dry scrublands.

Systematics 
The following genera and species are present in the Harpactirinae.  In addition, the genus Brachionopus (Pocock, 1897) has been suggested for placement in this subfamily, but its taxonomy is currently disputed.

Augacephalus (Gallon, 2002)
Type species: Augacephalus breyeri

In synonymy:
Augacephalus nigrifemur (Schmidt, 1995) = Augacephalus junodi

Augacephalus breyeri (Hewitt, 1919) — Mozambique, South Africa, Eswatini
Augacephalus ezendami (Gallon, 2001) — Mozambique, the Mozambique Gold[en] Baboon, Mozambique Half Moon Baboon
Augacephalus junodi (Simon, 1904) — East, South Africa, the [East African] Bushveld Golden Brown Featherleg Baboon

Bacillochilus (Gallon, 2010) [monotypic]

Bacillochilus xenostridulans (Gallon, 2010) — Angola

Brachionopus (Pocock, 1897)
To quote Platnick's World Spider Catalog v. 12.5,  "N.B.: transferred here from the Barychelidae by Raven, 1985a: 112; Brachyonopus is an unjustified emendation; Raven's transfer was not accepted by Charpentier, 1993: 5 or Schmidt, 2002a: 12 and 2008: 3, who nevertheless identified no close relatives of the genus among the known barychelids; Gallon, 2002: 204 argued for its inclusion in the Barychelidae but indicated that it "does not fit in any current barychelid subfamily" but later (Gallon, 2010b: 79) considered it a harpactirine.".

In other words, its taxonomy is in dispute and the many recent workers do not consider it a theraphosid. All are found in South Africa.

Brachionopus annulatus (Purcell, 1903)
Brachionopus leptopelmiformis (Strand, 1907)
Brachionopus pretoriae (Purcell, 1904)
Brachionopus robustus (Pocock, 1897)
Brachionopus tristis (Purcell, 1903)

Ceratogyrus (Pocock, 1897) [Senior synonym of Coelogenium Purcell, 1902]
Type species: Ceratogyrus darlingi

Transferred to other genera:
Ceratogyrus ezendami → Augacephalus ezendami
Ceratogyrus nigrifemur → Augacephalus nigrifemur
Ceratogyrus raveni (Smith, 1990) → Pterinochilus chordatus

In synonymy:
Ceratogyrus bechuanicus (Purcell, 1902) and Ceratogyrus schultzei (Purcell, 1908) = Ceratogyrus darlingi
Ceratogyrus cornuatus (De Wet & Dippenaar-Schoeman, 1991) = Ceratogyrus marshalli

Ceratogyrus brachycephalus (Hewitt, 1919) — Botswana, Zimbabwe, South Africa, the [Botswanan] Greater Horned Baboon
Ceratogyrus darlingi (Pocock, 1897) — Zimbabwe, Mozambique, the [Zimbabwean, African] Rear Horned Baboon, Curved Horn Baboon
Ceratogyrus dolichocephalus (Hewitt, 1919) — Zimbabwe
Ceratogyrus hillyardi (Smith, 1990) — Malawi
Ceratogyrus marshalli (Pocock, 1897) — Zimbabwe, Mozambique, the [Zimbabwean] Straight Horned Baboon
Ceratogyrus meridionalis (Hirst, 1907) — Malawi, Mozambique, the [Malawian], Zimbabwe{an} Gray Baboon
Ceratogyrus paulseni (Gallon, 2005) — Republic of South Africa
Ceratogyrus pillansi (Purcell, 1902) — Zimbabwe, Mozambique
Ceratogyrus sanderi (Strand, 1906) — Namibia, Zimbabwe, the [Namibian] Sandy Horned Baboon

Eucratoscelus (Pocock, 1898)
Type species: Eucratoscelus constrictus

Transferred to other genera:
Eucratoscelus tenuitibialis (Schmidt & Gelling, 2000) → Pterinochilus lugardi

In synonymy:
Eucratoscelus longiceps (Pocock, 1898) and Eucratoscelus spinifer = Eucratoscelus constrictus

Eucratoscelus constrictus (Gerstäcker, 1873) — Kenya, Tanzania
Eucratoscelus pachypus (Schmidt & Von Wirth, 1990) — Tanzania

Harpactira (Ausserer, 1871)
Type species: Harpactira atra

Harpactira atra (Latreille, 1832) — South Africa
Harpactira baviana (Purcell, 1903) — South Africa
Harpactira cafreriana (Walckenaer, 1837) — South Africa
Harpactira chrysogaster (Pocock, 1897) — South Africa
Harpactira curator (Pocock, 1898) — South Africa
Harpactira curvipes (Pocock, 1897) — South Africa
Harpactira dictator (Purcell, 1902) — South Africa
Harpactira gigas (Pocock, 1898) — South Africa
Harpactira guttata (Strand, 1907) — South Africa
Harpactira hamiltoni (Pocock, 1902) — South Africa
Harpactira lineata (Pocock, 1897) — South Africa
Harpactira lyrata (Simon, 1892) — South Africa
Harpactira marksi (Purcell, 1902) — South Africa
Harpactira namaquensis (Purcell, 1902) — Namibia, South Africa
Harpactira pulchripes (Pocock, 1901) — South Africa, the [South African] Golden Blue Leg{ged} Baboon, Slate Gray Leg(ged) Baboon
Harpactira tigrina (Ausserer, 1875) — South Africa

Harpactirella (Purcell, 1902) [Senior synonym of Luphocemus {Denis, 1960}]
Type species: Harpactirella treleaveni

Transferred to other genera:
Harpactirella flavipilosa (Lawrence, 1936) → Pterinochilus lugardi
Harpactirella latithorax (Strand, 1908) → Euathlus vulpinus
Harpactirella leleupi (Benoit, 1965) → Idiothele nigrofulva

Harpactirella domicola (Purcell, 1903) — South Africa
Harpactirella helenae (Purcell, 1903) — South Africa
Harpactirella insidiosa (Denis, 1960) — Morocco (Dubious)
Harpactirella karrooica (Purcell, 1902) — South Africa
Harpactirella lapidaria (Purcell, 1908) — South Africa
Harpactirella lightfooti (Purcell, 1902) — South Africa
Harpactirella longipes (Purcell, 1902) — South Africa
Harpactirella magna (Purcell, 1903) — South Africa
[[Harpactirella overdijki]] (Gallon, 2010) — South Africa
Harpactirella schwarzi (Purcell, 1904) — South Africa
Harpactirella spinosa (Purcell, 1908) — South Africa
Harpactirella treleaveni (Purcell, 1902) — South Africa

Idiothele (Hewitt, 1919)
Type species: Idiothele nigrofulva

In synonymy:
Idiothele crassispina (Purcell, 1902) and Idiothele leleupi (Benoit, 1965) = Idiothele nigrofulva

Idiothele mira (Gallon, 2010) - South Africa, the South African Blue Footed Trapdoor Baboon
Idiothele nigrofulva (Pocock, 1898) — Southern Africa

Pterinochilus (Pocock, 1897) [Senior synonym of Pterinochilides {Strand, 1920}]
Type species: Pterinochilus vorax

Transferred to other genera:
Pterinochilus breyeri → Augacephalus breyeri
Pterinochilus constrictus and Pterinochilus spinifer → Eucratoscelus constrictus
Pterinochilus crassispinus and Pterinochilus nigrofulvus → Idiothele nigrofulva
Pterinochilus junodi and Pterinochilus nigrifemur → Augacephalus junodi
Pterinochilus meridionalis → Ceratogyrus meridionalis
Pterinochilus schoenlandi → Trichognathella schoenlandi

In synonymy:
Pterinochilus affinis (Tullgren, 1910), Pterinochilus brunellii (Caporiacco, 1940), Pterinochilus carnivorus (Strand, 1917), Pterinochilus raptor (Strand, 1906), Pterinochilus raveni (Smith, 1990), Pterinochilus sjostedti (Tullgren, 1910), and Pterinochilus widenmanni (Strand, 1906) = Pterinochilus chordatus
Pterinochilus flavipilosus (Lawrence, 1936), Pterinochilus pluridentatus (Hewitt, 1919), and Pterinochilus tenuitibialis = Pterinochilus lugardi
Pterinochilus hindei (Hirst, 1907), Pterinochilus leetzi (Schmidt, 2002), and Pterinochilus mamillatus (Strand, 1906) = Pterinochilus murinus
Pterinochilus mutus (Strand, 1920), Pterinochilus obenbergeri (Strand, 1920), and Pterinochilus occidentalis (Strand, 1920) = Pterinochilus simoni

Pterinochilus alluaudi (Berland, 1914) — Kenya
Pterinochilus andrewsmithi (Gallon, 2009) — Northwestern Kenya
Pterinochilus chordatus (Gerstäcker, 1873) — East Africa, the Kilimanjaro Mustard Baboon
Pterinochilus cryptus (Gallon, 2008) — Angola
Pterinochilus lapalala (Gallon & Engelbrecht, 2011) — Waterberg mountains of Limpopo Province, South Africa
Pterinochilus lugardi (Pocock, 1900) — Eastern and Southern Africa, the Dodoma Fort Hall Baboon
Pterinochilus murinus (Pocock, 1897) — Angola, Central, Eastern, Southern Africa, the Usumbara Orange Baboon, Mombasa Golden Starburst [Baboon], "OBT"
Pterinochilus raygabrieli (Gallon, 2009) — Southcentral Kenya
Pterinochilus simoni (Berland, 1917) — Angola, Congo
Pterinochilus vorax (Pocock, 1897) — Angola, Central, East Africa

Trichognathella (Gallon, 2004) [Monotypic?]

Trichognathella schoenlandi (Pocock, 1900) — South Africa

References

External links 
 Norman I. Platnick: The World Spider Catalog, American Museum of Natural History.
 www.baboonspiders.de Baboon spiders Systematic Taxonomy
 www.baboonspiders.de  Key of the genera of the subfamily Harpactirinae

Theraphosidae
Spiders of Africa
Spider subfamilies